Thomas James Mathiesen (born 30 April 1947) is an American musicologist, whose research focuses on Ancient music and the music theory of ancient and early periods. A leading scholar of the music of Ancient Greece, Mathiesen has written four monographs and numerous articles on the topic.

Life and career
Thomas James Mathiesen was born in Roslyn Heights, New York, US on 30 April 1947. He received a Bachelor of Arts at Willamette University in 1968, and both a Master of Music and a PhD at the University of Southern California (USC). At the latter school, Mathiesen's teachers included scholars such as Ingolf Dahl and Halsey Stevens. After a stint teaching at USC from 1971 to 1972, he became a professor at the Brigham Young University. In 1988 he became a professor at Indiana University Bloomington, and in 1996 he was made a distinguished Professor of Music there.

Mathiesen's research centers around Ancient music, in particular, he is a leading scholar of the music of Ancient Greece. This subject is the topic of his four book-length studies, Aristides Quintilianus on Music in Three Books: Translation, with Introduction, Commentary, and Annotations (1983), Ancient Greek Music Theory: A Catalogue raisonné of Manuscripts RISM B/XI (1988), Greek Views of Music (1997) and Apollo’s Lyre: Greek Music and Music Theory in Antiquity and the Middle Ages (1999). Other topics he engages in include the history of music theory, particularly of Medieval music and Renaissance music. His scholarship includes the topics of "textual criticism, editorial technique, bibliography and codicology".

Mathiesen established in 1990 the online project Thesaurus Musicarum Latinarum (TML) and led it until 2015. Due to his efforts TML became a world-wide known database of early music treatises, with a free access.

The recipient of numerous awards and grants, Mathiesen has received a Guggenheim Fellowship in 1990, the American Musicological Society's Kinkeldey Award and multiple Deems Taylor Awards from ASCAP, among others.

Selected bibliography

References

1947 births
20th-century musicologists
21st-century musicologists
Living people